The 1938–39 season was Newport County's 17th season in the Football League Third Division South and 18th overall in the Football League. They had been ever-present in the third tier except for the 1931–32 season since the introduction of the Football League Third Division in 1920.

Newport County attained promotion to the Football League Second Division for the 1939–40 season on 15 April 1939 with two league games remaining following a 3–0 win over Southend United.

Season review

Results summary

Results by round

Fixtures and results

Third Division South

FA Cup

Third Division South Cup

Welsh Cup

League table

Pld = Matches played; W = Matches won; D = Matches drawn; L = Matches lost; F = Goals for; A = Goals against;GA = Goal average; GD = Goal difference; Pts = Points

External links
 Newport County 1938-1939 : Results
 Newport County football club match record: 1939
 Welsh Cup 1938/39

References

1938-39
English football clubs 1938–39 season
1938–39 in Welsh football